Furslide was an alternative rock band from New York, NY. They released one full-length album, called Adventure, which was released on Meanwhile..., a sublabel of Virgin Records created by Nellee Hooper, on October 6, 1998.

History
Their lead vocalist, Jennifer Turner, was playing as a guitarist on the Tigerlily tour with Natalie Merchant, when Turner formed Furslide together with Jason Lader and Adam MacDougall in early 1997. Furslide was the first band on Nellee Hooper's new label Meanwhile... when they were signed in 1998. They released their first album, Adventure, in fall 1998 and played a couple of shows subsequently in the US, the UK and across Europe  and opened for Lenny Kravitz on October 8, 1998, in Detroit.They were the support act for Kula Shaker, Alanis Morissette and Ben Folds). In 1999, they band dissolved, supposedly because of disappointing record sales.

The music of Furslide is diverse and multifaceted. Turner names Joni Mitchell, Chrissie Hynde and Natalie Merchant as influences.

Their track "Over My Head" was used on the Buffy the Vampire Slayer soundtrack album.

Members
The band consisted of the following members:
 Jennifer Turner, guitars and vocals
 Jason Lader, bass guitar
 Adam MacDougall, drums

Discography

Studio albums
Adventure (1998)

References

External links
 Official Virgin website for Furslide
 "FURSLIDE'S EXCELLENT 'ADVENTURE'", article on Pause and Play

Alternative rock groups from New York (state)
Musical groups from New York (state)
Musical groups established in 1997
Musical groups disestablished in 1998
Virgin Records artists